Temple Hills is an unincorporated area and census-designated place (CDP) in Prince George's County, Maryland, United States. Temple Hills borders the communities of Hillcrest Heights, Marlow Heights, Camp Springs and Oxon Hill. Per the 2020 census, the population was 8,350.

The community was named after Edward Temple, who in the 1860s lived in a home beside Henson Creek known as Moor Park. Within the area are numerous garden apartments, duplexes, and single family communities constructed mostly from the 1950s through 1970s. The adjacent, unincorporated communities of Hillcrest Heights and Marlow Heights, which are home to both the Iverson Mall & Marlow Heights Shopping Center, which both serve the community of Temple Hills, are assigned Temple Hills addresses and zipcodes.

Rosecroft Raceway (since 1949, harness horse racing) is nearby in Oxon Hill, although the racing audience has declined greatly. There are large public indoor and outdoor swimming pools operated by the Maryland-National Capital Park and Planning Commission, and also the private Temple Hills Swim Club. The area is especially convenient to the Capital Beltway (I-95/I-495), the Metrorail Green Line, Andrews Air Force Base, the U.S. Census Bureau, and Capitol Hill.

Since the clogged interstate Woodrow Wilson Bridge was widened in 2008, commuter access to Northern Virginia's booming job market has improved.

Geography
Temple Hills is located at  (38.810580, −76.946360).

Demographics

2020 census

Note: the US Census treats Hispanic/Latino as an ethnic category. This table excludes Latinos from the racial categories and assigns them to a separate category. Hispanics/Latinos can be of any race.

2000 Census
At the 2000 census, there were 7,792 people, 3,156 households and 1,937 families residing in the CDP. The racial makeup of the CDP was 9.32% White, 85.01% African American, 0.21% Native American, 1.40% Asian, 0.15% Pacific Islander, 2.37% from other races, and 1.54% from two or more races. Hispanic or Latino of any race were 4.39% of the population.

There were 3,156 households, of which 36.7% had children under the age of 18 living with them, 28.8% were married couples living together, 27.1% had a female householder with no husband present, and 38.6% were non-families. 32.3% of all households were made up of individuals, and 3.2% had someone living alone who was 65 years of age or older. The average household size was 2.47 and the average family size was 3.11.

Age distribution was 29.6% under the age of 18, 10.2% from 18 to 24, 37.0% from 25 to 44, 18.3% from 45 to 64, and 4.9% who were 65 years of age or older. The median age was 30 years. For every 100 females, there were 82.9 males. For every 100 females age 18 and over, there were 74.2 males.

The median household income was $44,868 and the median family income was $49,318. Males had a median income of $35,192 compared with $32,500 for females. The per capita income for the CDP was $21,939. About 9.9% of families and 10.4% of the population were below the poverty line, including 16.4% of those under age 18 and 2.9% of those age 65 or over.

Government
Prince George's County Police Department District 4 Station in Glassmanor CDP, with an Oxon Hill postal address, serves the community.

The United States Postal Service operates the Temple Hills Post Office in the Marlow Heights CDP, with a Temple Hills postal address. It also operates the Anacostia Carrier Annex in the Hillcrest Heights CDP, also with a Temple Hills postal address.

Education

The CDP is served by the Prince George's County Public Schools district.

Samuel Chase and J. Frank Dent elementaries serve sections of the CDP. All residents of the CDP are zoned to Thurgood Marshall Middle School, and Crossland High School. Crossland High is physically in Camp Springs CDP and has a Temple Hills postal address.

Notable people
 Mark Davis, radio talk show host and columnist, now in Dallas-Ft. Worth, grew up in Temple Hills
 Mike Easton, bantamweight for the Ultimate Fighting Championship
 Peter Bergman, actor on The Young and the Restless
 William T. Randall, (1915–2013) a Negro league baseball player
 Frank Small, Jr., member of U.S. House of Representatives Maryland's 5th District, 1953-1955, born in Temple Hills in 1896
 Julian Peterson, linebacker for the Detroit Lions
 Michael A. Jackson, former sheriff
 Rico Nasty, American rapper and singer

References

External links

 Marlow Heights 60s and 70s

Census-designated places in Prince George's County, Maryland
Census-designated places in Maryland
Washington metropolitan area